Happy Yipee Yehey! is a Philippine noontime variety show that was broadcast by ABS-CBN and worldwide through The Filipino Channel. The show was hosted by Randy Santiago, John Estrada, Rico J. Puno, Pokwang and Toni Gonzaga. The show was also co-hosted by Bentong, Bianca Manalo, John Prats, Matteo Guidicelli and Melai Cantiveros. The show premiered on February 12, 2011, replacing Pilipinas Win Na Win, with a stadium launch at the Ynares Sports Arena. Less than a year, after 51 weeks on February 4, 2012, the show formally had its live finale at the AFP Theater with the "My Girl" grand finals and was replaced by It's Showtime.

Cast

Main hosts
Randy Santiago (2011–2012)
John Estrada (2011–2012)
Toni Gonzaga (2011–2012)
Rico J. Puno† (2011–2012)
Pokwang (2011–2012)

Co-hosts
Bentong† (2011–2012)
Bianca Manalo (2011–2012)
John Prats (2011–2012)
Matteo Guidicelli (2011–2012)
Melai Cantiveros (2011–2012)

Featuring
HYY Hot Stuff ("Dancers") (2011–2012)
Joy Cancio (Choreographer) (2011–2012)
DJ Ace Ramos (2011–2012)
SexBomb Girls (2011–2012)

Former
Jobert Austria (2011)    
Sam Milby (2011)
Jason Francisco (2011)                                                                    
Mariel Rodriguez (2011)

Development
The existence of the show was first revealed by Willie Revillame on the January 26 episode of Willing Willie. Revillame voiced his ten-minute resentment over close friends and ex-Magandang Tanghali Bayan co-hosts Santiago and Estrada for accepting a noontime show with ABS-CBN, Revillame's former station with whom he has legal issues. Two days later on January 28, ABS-CBN's Push announced a new variety show in the works in which Willie was referring to. On February 4, TV Patrol officially announced the show with the complete cast list. Also announced, the show's dancers will be choreographed by Joy Cancio, manager of the SexBomb Girls of Eat Bulaga!.  First, the show was earlier reported to premiere on February 5, then on February 7 along with The Price Is Right before setting the date to February 12. It's Showtime returned to its original timeslot in the morning. On February 6, a dry run of the show was held. Creative director Willy Cuevas also revealed the name of two segments: "Hole-logs" and "Kitang-kits".

Various cast members have presented Happy Yipee Yehey. Sam Milby left because of his upcoming film projects such as Forever and a Day. Jobert Austria left the show to focus both on Banana Split, Usapang Lalake of Studio 23 and presently in the new weekly comedy series Toda Max. Jason Francisco of the popular Melason tandem later joined the co-hosts along with his partner Melai Cantiveros as the replacement of Austria but eventually left due to commitments on  other TV programs such as Banana Split and Angelito. Former Pilipinas Win Na Win hosts Pokwang and Rico J. Puno also later joined the main hosts.

from February 14 to September 16, 2011, the program was broadcast live in Studio 4 of the ABS-CBN Broadcasting Center. Originally, the studio was a temporary set up while The Price Is Right took over Studio 3 in 2011. Studio 3 was home to the network's daily afternoon variety shows since the late 1990s with 'Sang Linggo nAPO Sila until 2010 with Pilipinas Win Na Win. Beginning in September 17 of the same year, the program moved out of Studio 4 and back to the traditional studio, Studio 3, in which has a reputation of a large capacity, and more technological capabilities for the new set. The same day, two new long-term segments would be introduced entitled "Batang Genius" and "Miss Kasambahay". Studio 3 remained the show's home until January 25, 2012.

Major pieces of Studio 3's set were transferred to the show's new home in Dolphy Theatre (Studio 1) beginning January 26, 2012's live episode. Studio 1 is a former home studio of their rival show Eat Bulaga! on ABS-CBN from 1989 to 1995. A few hours later after a broadcast of TV Patrol, ABS-CBN released an official statement, stating that the show will air its final episode on February 4, 2012, with its "My Girl" grand finale.

Segments

Final segments

My Girl
Presented Mondays, Wednesdays and Fridays, three female contestants ranging from 16 to 20 years old battle out showing off their lives, and talents in pageant-style while answering the question of the day. The criteria used are 50% for beauty, 25% for personality, and 25% for audience impact. The contestant with the highest score for that day wins ₱10,000 and will advanced to the weekly finals where the winner of that Saturday will advance to the monthly finals. The runners-up win ₱5,000. In the monthly finals, the rules and criteria are the same except one question will be asked by a celebrity panel of judges, and one bonus question by the hosts. All of the prizes and consolation prizes were sponsored by YSA botanica 2 in 1 skin soap with kojic acid.  With six competitors in the monthly finals, the winner(s) will win ₱30,000 and advance to the grand finals for a chance to win ₱1,000,000,  and a Star Magic contract, and a brand new car sponsored by BNY jeans, the one who will win the car must get the highest text votes on the grand finals and one texter will have a chance to win P50,000 via electronic raffle. The grand finals will be on February 4, 2012, the show's final episode.

Who's The Girl?
Played Tuesdays, Thursdays and Saturdays, the celebrity player of the day must guess who's the one of three girls as the true "Certified Girl" by showing her fashion style, voice and talent. If the player correctly identifies the "Certified Girl", he/she will win P15,000. If the player identifies the fake girl, the "Certified Pa-Girl", the "Certified Girl" will win P15,000.

3-in-1 Tanging Hinga Mo
Played weekdays, three groups of three players will be chosen to play the game and the group who has the longest breathe after singing a certain song will get an Extreme Magic Sing, a MSE pangkabuhayan showcase, and ULOAD Package and will advanced to the jackpot round. The non winners will also receive P3,000. The jackpot round has the same mechanics as the elimination round the group must have a long breathing technique which in every second of breathing is equivalent to P1,000 and if you can get it up to 90 seconds you will win up to P200,000.

Susi ng Kapalaran
Three groups of ten contestants will battle out in an Elimination Round. The hosts will clue into a specific word, and the first three/four contestants from each group that successfully answers the correct word will pick one key from up to ten keys and advance to the Battle Round.

The ten contestants that earned their place with a key will battle each other in a Battle Round. The contestants need to simply answer a trivial question given by the hosts. The contestant that answers correctly has the opportunity to take a key from another contestant. If a contestant does not have any keys in play, they are automatically eliminated. The contestant who earns a key in a round cannot play for another key must skip the next round. The first contestant who holds three or four keys in play will advance to the Jackpot Round in which they can win P500,000, a brand new Jeepney, and P1,000,000.

The Jackpot Round will consist of the contestant's three or four keys in play, plus the six or seven keys not in play. A host will offer money amounts to buy their keys out of their game. When a contestant decides their keys to keep and sell for the jackpot, they must use the kept keys now to open vaults containing their prizes. There are three vaults to choose from: The Happy Vault, Yipee Vault, and Yehey Vault. The contestant must now decide which key to use to open only one vault. Once they decide, the host will play the key in the vault. The vault should light up as red first, then blue, and if the contestant is lucky, a yellow light will flash resulting in a jackpot win. However, if both red and blue closes and the "Maling Susi" landed, this signifies that the key does not work and is out of play. A contestant is allowed to use another key in the same vault as well. Also, the host will offer money amounts to the contestant if they are unsure that the vault will open until they accept or decline as a final answer.

Feeling Genius
Played Saturdays, two celebrity players (defending champion vs. new player) will fight each other. The player who won every week is considered as defending champion and will play next game. The format was used during the Grand Finals of the predecessor, "Batang Genius". Each Question consists of 1, 2 or 3 points. One point is equivalent to one step. Each player will have 3 atras powers to move a leading player backwards. The player who reach the winning spot (12 steps) will win the game.

Discontinued segments

Happy Yipee Yehey! "Nananana!": The Album

The debut album composed of seven music tracks and the bonus tracks (Minus One) featuring the Happy Yipee Yehey! Casts was released.

Special episodes

Tours
Lingayen, Pangasinan (April 30, 2011)
Dammam, Saudi Arabia (December 9, 2011)

Awards and nominations
2011 Anak TV Seal Awardee (Most Favorite TV Programs) - Nominated
25th PMPC Star Award For TV (Best Variety Show) - Nominated
2011 Golden Screen Awards (Outstanding Variety Show) - Nominated
2011 Ateneo de Manila University Dangal ng Bayan Awards (Best Noontime Show) - Won

Ratings
Happy Yipee Yehey! registered low ratings ranging from 8 to 10% while its rival show, Eat Bulaga! registered higher ratings ranging from 18 to 24% and sometimes hits the 30% mark. Its final episode, however, rated 17.3% but still failed to beat EB's 23.7%

See also
List of programs broadcast by ABS-CBN
MTB (1998–2005)
Wowowee (2005–2010)
Pilipinas Win Na Win (2010)
It's Showtime (2009–present)

References

External links

ABS-CBN original programming
2011 Philippine television series debuts
2012 Philippine television series endings
Philippine variety television shows
Filipino-language television shows